The northeastern plain-nosed burrowing snake (Antaioserpens albiceps) is a species of snake native to far north Queensland.

References

Snakes of Australia
Endemic fauna of Australia
Antaioserpens
Reptiles described in 1898]